Abdellatif Kechiche (born 7 December 1960) is a Tunisian-French actor, film director and screenwriter. He made his directorial debut in 2000 with La Faute à Voltaire, which he also wrote. Known for his naturalistic style, he has been awarded several times at the César Awards and won the Palme d’Or at the 2013 Cannes film festival for his film Blue Is the Warmest Colour.

Early life 
Born in Tunis, Tunisia, Kechiche emigrated with his parents to Nice, France when he was six years old. Passionate about theater, he took drama classes at the Antibes Conservatory. He performed several shows on the Cote d’Azur, most notably a play by Federico Garcia Lorca in 1978 and a play by Eduardo Manet the following year. He was equally as dedicated to directing as he was to performing in theater, he presented The Architect at the Avignon Festival in 1981.

In film, his first acting role was in Abdelkrim Bahioul’s Mint Tea, where he played a young Algerian immigrant who moved to Paris to make his fortune.

André Téchiné hired him in 1987 in The Innocents where he played a gigolo with Sandrine Bonnaire and Jean-Claude Brialy. Thanks to Nouri Bouzid’s film Bezness , he won the best male actor award at the Namur Festival in 1992.

That same year he met his companion, Ghalya Lacroix, with whom he would collaborate with in writing and editing his future projects.  

As an actor, his introduction to most English-speaking audiences was starring as Ashade the taxi driver in the 2005 psychological thriller Sorry, Haters, an "official selection" in both the Toronto International and American Film Institute's film festivals.

He was decorated by the government of Zine El Abidine Ben Ali in 2005 and in 2008.

Career as a director 
In 2003, he wrote and directed Games of Love and Chance (L’Esquive) with amateur actors and an extremely limited budget. The film follows a group of high school students from the Parisian suburbs who rehearse a Marivaux play for their French class. The film was an honorable success for an author’s film without known actors; it was hailed by critics as one of the biggest French films of the year 2004. The film won four awards at the, 30th César awards in 2005: Best film, best director, and best screenplay. Sara Forestier a lead actress won the César for most promising actress for her role in Games of Love and Chance.

He then directed The Secret of the Grain (La Graine et le mulet) in 2006, which evokes the journey of a worker of Maghrebian origin who wants to establish a restaurant in the port of Sete as an inheritance for his family, but meets French bureaucratic opposition. He presented The Secret of the Grain at the 64th Mostra del Cinema in Venice for which he was awarded the Special Jury Prize.  The film also received the FIPRESCI Prize, the Louis Delluc Prize and the César Awards for Best Film and Best Director. 

Kechiche’s next film was selected at the Venice Film Festival 2010, titled Black Venus (Vénus Noire) in reference to the “Vénus Hottentote” (Saartjie Baartman). The film follows the life of Sarah Baartman, a Khoikhoi woman from the early 19th century who was exhibited in Europe for her voluptuous figure and objectified by European women. The film’s critical reception was positive, despite only receiving one nomination at the César Awards in 2011.

His 2013 film Blue Is the Warmest Colour won the Palme d'Or and the FIPRESCI Prize at the 2013 Cannes Film Festival. Several days later a controversy erupted about Kechiche's work methods; technicians on the film accused him of harassment, unpaid overtime and violations of labour laws. The two main actresses, Léa Seydoux and Adèle Exarchopoulos, who were also awarded the Palme d'Or, had complained about Kechiche's behavior during the shooting but later, in an extensive interview, claimed that although he was difficult to work with it had been worth it, as he was a great filmmaker. The film also won Best International Independent Film at the British Independent Film Awards in 2013.

Allegation of sexual assault 

In October 2018, Kechiche was accused of sexual assault by an actress, whose name was withheld from official reports. French prosecutors later dropped the probe, citing insufficient evidence.

Selected filmography

References

Further reading
 Review of The Secret of the Grain.

External links

1960 births
Living people
Writers from Tunis
Tunisian male film actors
Tunisian film directors
Directors of Palme d'Or winners
French male film actors
20th-century French male actors
French film directors
French film producers
French male screenwriters
French screenwriters
European Film Awards winners (people)
Best Director International Eurasia Award winners
Best Director César Award winners
Best Director Lumières Award winners
Tunisian emigrants to France
21st-century Tunisian male actors
People from Tunis